Roaring Creek is a stream in the U.S. state of West Virginia. It is a tributary of the Tygart Valley River. It rises on the western slopes of Rich Mountain, flows for approximately 13 miles, and joins the Tygart about 2 miles downstream of Aggregates, West Virginia.

Roaring Creek was descriptively named on account of its roaring waters. At suitable water levels the 5 miles from Coalton to the confluence is a class III to V whitewater run.

See also
List of rivers of West Virginia

References

Rivers of Randolph County, West Virginia
Rivers of West Virginia